The London, Midland and Scottish Railway (LMS) was created under the terms of the Railways Act 1921. The first schedule to that Act listed four groups, and for each, a number of "Constituent Companies" were listed, as were a number of subsidiary companies. The constituent companies would amalgamate to create a new railway company, and the subsidiary companies would be absorbed either by one of the constituent companies prior to the amalgamation, or by the new railway company after amalgamation. The group that was to become the LMS was described in the Act as "the North Western, Midland and West Scottish Group".

Constituent companies
The following made up the London, Midland and Scottish Railway as a result of the Railways Act 1921:

Caledonian Railway (CalR)  route miles (1,794 km)
Furness Railway (Furness) 158 miles (254 km)
Glasgow and South Western Railway  miles (794 km)
Highland Railway(HR) 506 miles (814 km)
London and North Western Railway (LNWR) – with which the Lancashire and Yorkshire Railway (L&YR) had been amalgamated on 1 January 1922. Total route mileage (1923) was  miles (4,293 km)
Midland Railway (MidR)  miles (3,473 km)
North Staffordshire Railway (NSR)  miles (355 km)

Subsidiary companies
Independently operated lines
 Cleator and Workington Junction Railway  miles (49 km) (partially worked by the Furness Railway)
 Knott End Railway  miles (19 km)
 Maryport and Carlisle Railway  miles (68.8 km)
 North London Railway 16 miles (26 km) (managed by the LNWR)
 Stratford-upon-Avon and Midland Junction Railway  miles (109 km)
 Wirral Railway  miles (22 km)
Independent lines for which rolling stock was provided by other companies
Cockermouth, Keswick and Penrith Railway  miles (49 km)
Non-working companies
 Originally leased to or worked by LNWR
 Charnwood Forest Railway  miles (17 km)
 Dearne Valley Railway 21 miles (34 km)
 Harborne Railway  miles (4 km)
 Mold and Denbigh Junction Railway 15 miles (24 km)
 Shropshire Union Railways and Canal Company  miles (47 km) [part of this system was jointly leased with the Great Western Railway (GWR)]
 Originally leased to or worked by MidR
 Tottenham and Forest Gate Railway 6 miles (10 km)
 Yorkshire Dales Railway 9 miles (14 km)
 Originally leased to or worked by CalR
 Arbroath and Forfar Railway  miles (24 km)
 Brechin and Edzell District Railway  miles (10 km)
 Callander and Oban Railway  miles (161 km)
 Dundee and Newtyle Railway  miles (23 km)
 Killin Railway  miles (8 km)
 Lanarkshire and Ayrshire Railway  miles (58 km)
 Solway Junction Railway  miles (20 km)
 Originally leased to or worked by HR
 Dornoch Light Railway  miles (12 km)
 Wick and Lybster Light Railway  miles (22 km)
 Originally leased to or worked by NSR
Leek and Manifold Valley Light Railway (narrow gauge)  miles (13 km)
 Originally leased to or worked by several component companies
 North & South Western Junction Railway  miles (8 km)
 Portpatrick and Wigtownshire Joint Railway  miles (132 km)

Joint railways

After 1923 amalgamations comprised wholly in the LMS
 Carlisle Citadel Station and Goods Traffic Joint Committees (originally joint owned by various companies)
 were LNW/MidR joint:
 Ashby and Nuneaton Railway  miles (47 km)
 Enderby Railway  miles (4 km)
 were LNW/L&YR joint:
 Lancashire Union Railway  miles  (21 km)
 North Union Railway  miles (10 km)
 Preston and Longridge Railway 8 miles (13 km)
 Preston and Wyre Joint Railway 46 miles (74 km)
 was Furness/MidR joint
 Furness and Midland Joint Railway  miles (16 km)
 was Furness/LNWR joint
 Whitehaven Cleator and Egremont Railway 35 miles (56 km)
 were Cal/GSW joint
 Glasgow, Barrhead and Kilmarnock Joint Railway  miles (48 km)
 Glasgow and Paisley Joint Railway  miles (23 km)

After 1923 amalgamations joint with London & North Eastern Railway
 Axholme Joint Railway  miles (45 km)
 Cheshire Lines Committee ( share) 142 miles (229 km)
 City of Glasgow Union Railway
 Dumbarton & Balloch (including Loch Lomond steamers) 7 miles (11 km)
 Dundee and Arbroath Railway (including Carmyllie Light Railway) 23 miles (37 km)
 Great Central and Midland Joint Railway  miles (65 km)
 Great Central, Hull & Barnsley and Midland Joint Railway ( share) 4 miles (6 km)
 Great Central and North Staffordshire Joint Railway 11 miles (18 km)
 Great Northern and London and North Western Joint Railway 45 miles (72 km)
 Halifax and Ovenden Railway  miles (4 km)
 Halifax High Level 3 miles (5 km)
 Manchester South Junction and Altrincham Railway  (a "joint working arrangement")  miles (15 km)
 Methley Joint Line 6 miles (10 km)
 Midland and Great Northern Joint Railway  miles (295 km)
 Norfolk and Suffolk Joint Railway (was GER/MidR/GNR joint)  miles (36 km)
 Oldham, Ashton and Guide Bridge Railway  miles (10 km)
 Otley and Ilkley Joint Railway  miles (10 km)
 Perth General Station Committee ( share)
 Prince's Dock, Glasgow  miles (2 km)
 South Yorkshire Joint Railway ( share)  miles (33 km)
 Swinton and Knottingley Joint Railway  miles (31 km)
 Tottenham and Hampstead Junction Railway  miles (8 km)

After 1923 amalgamations joint with GWR
 Birkenhead Railway  miles (91 km)
 Brecon and Merthyr Railway & London and North Western Joint Railway 6 miles (10 km)
 Brynmawr and Western Valleys Railway  miles (2 km)
 Clee Hill Railway 6 miles (10 km)
 Clifton Extension Railway 9 miles (14 km)
 Halesowen Joint Railway 6 miles (10 km)
 Nantybwch and Rhymney Railway 3 miles (5 km)
 Severn and Wye Railway 39 miles (63 km)
 Shrewsbury and Hereford Railway  miles (133 km)
 Tenbury Railway 5 miles (8 km)
 Vale of Towy Railway (owned by GWR but leased jointly) 11 miles (18 km)
 West London Railway  miles (4 km)
 Wrexham and Minera Railway 3 miles (5 km)

After 1923 amalgamations joint with Southern Railway
 Somerset and Dorset Joint Railway 105 miles (169 km)

After 1923 amalgamations joint with District Railway
 Whitechapel & Bow Railway 2 miles (3 km)

Irish lines
The Railways Act 1921 did not extend to Ireland, but Irish lines owned by constituent companies became part of the LMS:
 Dundalk, Newry and Greenore Railway (DNGR)  (owned by the LNWR) – operated from 1933 by the GNR(I)
 Northern Counties Committee lines (NCC)  (owned by the Midland Railway)
 The NCC and Great Northern Railway of Ireland (GNR(I)) operated the County Donegal Railways Joint Committee lines jointly, and these became joint lines of the LMS and GNR(I) after grouping.

Shipping companies
Caledonian Steam Packet Company

Shareholdings
 Great Western Railway (minority shareholding)
 London and North Eastern Railway
 London Electric Railway until 30 June 1933
 London Passenger Transport Board from 1 July 1933
 Great Northern Railway (Ireland) (minority shareholding)
 Great Southern Railways (minority shareholding)

References

Pre-grouping British railway companies
Big four British railway companies
 
London, Midland and Scottish Railway
Constituents of the London, Midland and Scottish Railway